La Grange Country Club is a private golf club in La Grange, Illinois, a suburb southwest of Chicago.

Founded  in 1899 and designed by Herbert J. Tweedie as a nine-hole golf course, the club relocated to its present location in 1913 and was expanded to 18 holes. It hosted the U.S. Women's Open, an LGPA major championship, in 1974 and 1981, and underwent a major renovation in 2001.

References

Golf clubs and courses in Illinois
Sports venues in Cook County, Illinois
La Grange, Illinois
Sports venues completed in 1899
1899 establishments in Illinois